Jianchang County is a county in southwestern Liaoning, China, under the administration of Huludao City.

Jianchang may also refer to:

Modern places
Jianchang, Jianchang County (建昌), a town in Jianchang County
Jianchang, Jiangxi (建昌), a town in Nancheng County, Jiangxi, China
Jianchang Subdistrict (碱场街道), a subdistrict in Lishu District, Jixi, Heilongjiang, China

Historical places
Xichang, a city in southern Sichuan, China, formerly known as Jianchang
Fuzhou, Jiangxi, where the town is located, formerly known as Jianchang

Historical eras
Jianchang (508–520), era name used by Yujiulü Chounu, khan of Rouran
Jianchang (555–560), era name used by Qu Baomao, king of Gaochang

See also
Jianchangosaurus, dinosaur discovered in Jianchang County